Papanasam is a 2015 Indian Tamil-language crime thriller film directed by Jeethu Joseph, a remake of his 2013 Malayalam film Drishyam, which starred Mohanlal. The film was jointly produced by Suresh Balaje and Rajkumar Sethupathi. It stars Kamal Haasan and Gautami, with Esther Anil, Asha Sarath and Roshan Basheer reprising their roles from the original film. Kalabhavan Mani, Nivetha Thomas and M. S. Bhaskar appear in supporting roles.

The film tells the story of Suyambu, a middle-class cable TV operator, and his family. They come under suspicion when Varun, the son of the Inspector General of police (IG), goes missing soon after sexually harassing Suyambu's elder daughter. The rest of the film reveals how Varun disappeared and what Suyambu does to keep his family from going to prison.

The production work of Papanasam was undertaken by Suresh Balaje and George Pious. Music for the film was composed by Ghibran. The cinematography was led by Sujith Vaassudev and the editing done by Ayoob Khan, who also worked for Jeethu's original counterpart film. Principal photography commenced on 25 August 2014 and lasted for seven months, with shooting held at Tirunelveli, Nanguneri, Tenkasi, Kuthukalvalasai, and Thodupuzha. The film released on 3 July 2015, and received positive reviews from critics.

Plot 
Suyambulingam is an orphan who had dropped out of school after his 5th grade. In 2014, he is a businessman running a cable TV service in Papanasam, a small town in the Tirunelveli district of Tamil Nadu. He owns two buildings in the main part of the village, and a well built house in a garden of area 5 acres. He is married to Rani and they have two daughters, 16 year old Selvi and 10 year old Meena. His only interest apart from his family is watching films. He spends most of his night time in front of the TV in his small office.

During a nature camp, Selvi bathing is photographed in the bathroom by a hidden cell phone. The culprit, Varun, is the son of Inspector General Geetha Prabhakar. Days later, Varun calls Selvi and blackmails her for sexual favours. He tells her to come to her house's garden shed at midnight. Selvi brings her mother along, and both beg for Varun to leave them alone. Varun asks Rani to replace Selvi in the deal. Enraged, Selvi hits the phone in Varun's hand with a metal rod, but the rod strikes Varun's head as well. Varun dies on the spot. Rani and Selvi bury his body in a compost pit, which is witnessed from afar by Meena.  The next morning, Rani tells Suyambulingam about the incident and he devises a way to save his family from the law. He removes Varun's broken cell phone, places the SIM card in another mobile phone which he throws it onto a National Permit lorry and disposes of Varun's yellow Maruti Zen car, which is seen by Constable Perumal, who has a grudge against Suyambulingam. Suyambulingam takes his family out on a trip to Tenkasi to attend a temple prayer meeting, watch a movie in a theatre, stay in a hotel and eat at a restaurant. Geetha  starts an investigation into her missing son.

After a preliminary investigation, Geetha calls Suyambulingam and his family for questioning. Suyambulingam, who had predicted that this would happen, had already taught his family how to change their alibis at the time of the murder. When questioned individually, they give the same replies. Suyambulingam also presents the bill of the restaurant, the hotel bill, the movie ticket and the bus tickets as proof of their alibi. Geetha questions the owners of the establishments they have been to and their statements prove Suyambulingam's alibi. However, Geetha subsequently realises later that Suyambulingam had faked the evidence and established his alibi on the owners by going on a trip with his family to the same establishments later. Meanwhile, Suyambulingam tells his brother-in-law, Thangaraj that if they are ever taken away by the police, he has to call the media and report their unlawful arrests.

Geetha arrests Suyambulingam and his family and Perumal uses brute force to beat the truth out of them. Eventually, Meena gives in and reveals the place where the body is buried. After digging the compost pit, they find the carcass of a wild boar, indicating that Suyambulingam had moved the body. Meena reports to the media and complains against Perumal. The constable is suspended, all officers in the Papanasam station are transferred out of the district and Geetha resigns from her post. The district court prohibits the police from investigating Suyambulingam's family without their permission, in any case.

Later, Geetha and her husband Prabhakar meet Suyambulingam to ask forgiveness for their rude and violent behaviour. Prabhakar then explains that they both plan to relocate to the US. Before leaving Prabhakar begs Suyambulingam to reveal what happened to Varun. Filled with guilt Suyumbulingam cryptically explained that Varun was killed by accident and apologises. The scene moves back to the police station at the beginning. As Suyambulingam signs out, the station the new SI tells him that he will find Varun's body and warns him. As Suyambulingam leaves a flashback is shown of him burying something in the construction of the station. Implying that he has hidden Varun's body underneath the station and it will never be found due to the new construction.

Cast 

Kamal Haasan as Suyambulingam
Gautami as Rani Suyambulingam
Nivetha Thomas as Selvi Suyambulingam
Esther Anil as Meena Suyambulingam
Asha Sarath as IG Geetha Prabhakar
Kalabhavan Mani as Constable Perumal
Anant Mahadevan as Prabhakar
Roshan Basheer as Varun Prabhakar
Ilavarasu as Head Constable Shanmugam 
Delhi Ganesh as Vijayakumar, Rani's father
Shanthi Williams as Radhika, Rani's mother
Charle as Kannan, Bus Conductor
Vaiyapuri as Krishnaswamy, Hotel Owner
M. S. Bhaskar as Sulaiman Baai
Aruldoss as Sub-Inspector Suresh Babu
Sree Raam as Cheramadurai
Abhishek Vinod as Thangaraj
Cheran Raj as Sub-Inspector Boominathan
Madhan Gopal as Karuppu
Kavi Periya Thambi as Mariappan
Jayamani as Bus Conductor
Hello Kandasamy as Cinema Operator
Nellai Siva as neighbour of Suyambulingam

Production

Development 
After the commercial and critical success of the 2013 Malayalam film Drishyam directed by Jeethu Joseph and starring Mohanlal, several regional producers approached the makers for remake rights. A Tamil version was planned to be jointly produced by Suresh Balaje, George Pius of Wide Angle Creations, Rajkumar Sethupathi and Sripriya Rajkumar of Raj Kumar Theatre. The team subsequently signed on Kamal Haasan in late January 2014, to enact the leading role after successful negotiations, with Jeethu Joseph choosing to direct the Tamil version himself. Jeethu said that Rajinikanth was initially approached to do the lead role and although he was interested to take up the role, he had doubts regarding a few scenes and how they would appeal to his fans. The pair then chose to alter the storyline to feature a Hindu family from Papanasam instead of Christian Keralite's, to make it familiar with Tamil audiences. Jeethu further said that the Tamil version had been made "more emotional" since Kamal Haasan felt that Tamil audiences like to be "emotionally piqued". In August 2014, the film was reported to be titled Papanasam. Pranav Mohanlal joined the team as an assistant director during the film's first schedule. Jeyamohan was selected to write the dialogues for the film. Noted writer/ director Sukawho is known for his characteristic Tirunelveli based short story series called 'Moongil Moochu' that was published in Ananda Vikatan trained Kamal Hassan to speak in Tirunelveli accent.

Casting 
Several actresses were considered and approached for the leading female roles, before the team made a final decision. Simran was reported to have signed the film, though she later stated that she was not working in the film. Nadhiya, Sridevi, and Abhirami were also considered for roles in the film. Joseph confirmed that Sridevi was not part of the project and that the team would make the official announcements as soon as the cast and crew were finalized. Kamal Haasan's partner Gautami was later confirmed to play Meena's role from the original in June 2014, marking her comeback to acting after a sixteen-year sabbatical. Asha Sarath was chosen to reprise her role as a police officer from the original version, while Kalabhavan Mani would portray Kalabhavan Shajon's role from the original. Niveda Thomas was signed on to play the elder daughter of the lead pair, while child artiste Esther Anil was also added to the cast, reprising her role from the original as well. Anant Mahadevan was selected to play the role of Siddique from the Malayalam version. Roshan Basheer was also selected to reprise his role as Varun from the original.

Filming 
Jeethu Joseph confirmed that shooting for the film would commence from the second half of 2014. The film kick-started with a formal pooja on 16 July 2014. Principal photography commenced on 25 August 2014. with first schedule beginning in Tirunelveli where scenes featuring Kamal Haasan and Gautami were initially shot. Shooting took place in Nanguneri and Tenkasi , kuthukalvalasai, Mekkarai, a town in the Tirunelveli district. Shooting also took place in Thodupuzha in the house originally used in the Malayalam version. The house underwent minor changes to look like a Tamil household. Working stills from the film were released on 11 September 2014. The shooting of the film was completed on 26 March 2015.

Alleged plagiarism 
Sathish Paul, a Malayalam filmmaker-scriptwriter filed a petition with the Ernakulam District Court asking to stop the Tamil remake of Drishyam, alleging that the original film was a copy of his story published as a book in May 2013 called Oru Mazhakalathu. Benoy Kadavan, Sathish's advocate, informed that his client was told by Jeethu that Drishyam was going to be a family drama, and not a thriller. But when the movie was released, he noted that it was an exact copy and that a notice was sent to Jeethu Joseph and both the Malayalam and the Tamil production houses asking for equal shares in the profits of the film. Jeethu clarified that his story might have had some similarities with the Japanese film, Suspect X (2008), but cited that it was not a copy of any other story and was willing to move to the high court to prove it.

In mid-March 2015, it was proved at the High Court that the allegation was false, with a verdict being passed confirming the film's originality.

Soundtrack 

The film's soundtrack is composed by Ghibran, continuing his association with Kamal Haasan after Uttama Villain (2015). As similar to the original counterpart, Papanasam features two songs which were written by lyricist Na. Muthukumar. The official tracklist was released on 10 June 2015, which features six instrumental tracks from the score, performed by Sofia Session Orchestra and two karaoke tracks of the songs. The album was launched on 13 June 2015, at the Suryan FM 93.5 radio station in Chennai, with the presence of the film's cast and crew.

The album received positive reviews from music critics. Behindwoods gave the soundtrack a rating of 2.75 out of 5, and summarised "An OST driven album which will work better with visuals!" Indiaglitz gave the album 3.25 out of 5 stars. Vipin Nair of Music Aloud stated that the album "has some good music that will fit right into the movie's narrative", giving a rating of 7.5 out of 10. Karthik Srinivasan of Milliblog stated "Papanasam is a thematic work from Ghibran".

Moviecrow gave the soundtrack 3.25 out of 5 and then summarised "Ghibran delivers brilliant soundscape which is required for the drama thriller movie and also only two vocal tracks in the album are also enjoyable within the limited framework required for the movies of this gen." Sharanya CR of The Times of India, praised the songs with mentioning "Yeya En Kottikara" as "soothing number", whilst also praising the efforts for the background score.

Release

Theatrical 
Kamal Haasan planned to release the film, after completing the release plans of Uttama Villain. But the delay in the latter's release, followed by the plagiarism allegation, against Jeethu Joseph, the director of the original, pushed its makers to release the film during the occasion of Eid-Ul-Fitr (17 July 2015). The first look and the theatrical trailer was unveiled on 13 May 2015. On mid-June 2015, it was announced that the film will be released theatrically on 3 July 2015.

Home Media 
The satellite rights of the film were sold to Sun TV.

Reception

Critical response 
The film receives highly positive reviews.
Hindustan Times gave the film 4 out of 5 and stated "A must watch for those fans of Kamal who have been waiting to see him as an actor -- not just a star driven to stunts". Deccan Chronicle gave 4 stars as well and wrote, "Riffing a sophisticated mix of the human condition and a simplistic storyline, Papanasam is a movie that engages your senses while managing to dispel any misgivings on a timely basis...director Jeethu Joseph has recreated the original magic of Drishyam but with a more localized flavor to boot". Filmibeat rated the film 4.5 out of 5 and concluded "Papanasam is a winning script and retaining Jeethu Joseph has helped immensely. But when a performer called Kamal Haasan takes up such a project, magic on screen is rest assured."

Sify wrote "the Tamil version is even tighter (than Drishyam) and there is absolutely no room for error in the writing. Flawless is the word", going on to call the film "excellent". Writing for Rediff, Sukanya Verma, while calling the film a "worthy remake of Drishyam, stated, "I still like Drishyam better but Papanasam is a laudable runner up even if somewhat self-aware". Baradwaj Rangan of the Hindu wrote "A faithful remake, a solid thriller
"

Box office
The film collected  on the first day of its release.

References

External links 
 
 
 

2010s Tamil-language films
2015 films
2015 crime thriller films
Fictional portrayals of the Tamil Nadu Police
Films directed by Jeethu Joseph
Films scored by Mohamaad Ghibran
Films shot in Tirunelveli
Indian crime thriller films
Shot-for-shot remakes
Tamil remakes of Malayalam films